Leonard Rhone House, also known as Rhoneymeade, is a historic home located at Potter Township, Centre County, Pennsylvania. It was built about 1853, and is a -story, "L"-shaped brick dwelling with a gable roof. It sits on a limestone foundation.  The interior has a traditional Georgian center hall plan.  Also on the property is a contributing outbuilding.  The house was built by Leonard Rhone, who is traditionally regarded as the father of the Grange Fair.

It was added to the National Register of Historic Places in 1985.

The house and the surrounding property are now maintained as an arboretum and sculpture garden. There also is a labyrinth on the property.  Visitors are welcomed free of charge on Saturdays and Sundays from 10am-4pm from April through October.

References

External links
  Rhoneymeade Arboretum & Sculpture Garden

Houses on the National Register of Historic Places in Pennsylvania
Georgian architecture in Pennsylvania
Houses completed in 1853
Houses in Centre County, Pennsylvania
National Register of Historic Places in Centre County, Pennsylvania